Calvin Dallas (born April 2, 1952) is a long-distance runner who represents the United States Virgin Islands. He competed in the men's marathon at the 1988 Summer Olympics and the 1992 Summer Olympics.

References

1952 births
Living people
Athletes (track and field) at the 1988 Summer Olympics
Athletes (track and field) at the 1991 Pan American Games
Athletes (track and field) at the 1992 Summer Olympics
United States Virgin Islands male long-distance runners
United States Virgin Islands male marathon runners
Olympic track and field athletes of the United States Virgin Islands
Place of birth missing (living people)
Pan American Games competitors for the United States Virgin Islands